Resapamea is a genus of moths of the family Noctuidae.

Species
The genus includes the following species:

 Resapamea alticola (Ronkay & Varga, 1998)
 Resapamea angelika Crabo, 2013
 Resapamea diluvius Crabo, 2013
 Resapamea enargia (Barnes & Benjamin, 1926)
 Resapamea hedeni (Graeser, [1889])
 Resapamea innota (Smith, 1908)
 Resapamea mammuthus Crabo, 2013
 Resapamea megaleuca (Varga & Ronkay, 1992)
 Resapamea passer (Guenée, 1852) (syn: Luperina virguncula (Smith, 1899), Luperina morna (Strecker, 1878))
 Resapamea stipata (Morrison, 1875)
 Resapamea tibeticola (Varga & Ronkay, 1992)
 Resapamea trigona (Smith, 1902)
 Resapamea vaskeni (Varga, 1979)
 Resapamea venosa (Smith, 1903)

References
Natural History Museum Lepidoptera genus database
Resapamea at funet

Hadeninae